FDOS may refer to:

 Floppy Disk Operating System, a term sometimes used to describe early floppy-based disk operating systems such as CP/M
 FDOS, the part of the Basic Disk Operating System (BDOS) implementing the filesystem in Digital Research operating systems such as the CP/M and DR-DOS families
 FreeDOS, a free disk operating system
 FDOS, First Day of Service

See also 
DOS (disambiguation)
FOS (disambiguation)